The Lesotho national cricket team is the team that represents Lesotho in international cricket. They became an affiliate member of the International Cricket Council (ICC) in 2001 and an associate member in 2017.

Lesotho has played international cricket since at least 1986, when they played Swaziland in Maseru. They made their official ICC debut at Division Three of the Africa Region of the ICC World Cricket League in April 2006, where they came last in the eight-team tournament. 

In April 2018, the ICC decided to grant full Twenty20 International (T20I) status to all its members. Therefore, all Twenty20 matches played between Lesotho and other ICC members after 1 January 2019 will be a full T20I.

Records and Statistics

International Match Summary — Lesotho
 
Last updated 25 November 2022

Twenty20 International 
 Highest team total: 153/3 v. Seychelles, 20 November 2022 at Gahanga International Cricket Stadium, Kigali. 
 Highest individual score: 68*, Maaz Khan v. Seychelles, 20 November 2022 at Gahanga International Cricket Stadium, Kigali. 
 Best individual bowling figures: 3/32, Yahya Jakda v. Seychelles, 20 November 2022 at Gahanga International Cricket Stadium, Kigali. 

Most T20I runs for Lesotho

Most T20I wickets for Lesotho

T20I record versus other nations

Records complete to T20I #1923. Last updated 25 November 2022.

Other matches
For a list of selected international matches played by Lesotho, see Cricket Archive.

See also
 List of Lesotho Twenty20 International cricketers
 Lesotho women's national cricket team

References

Cricket in Lesotho
National cricket teams
Cricket
Lesotho in international cricket